The Church of Jesus Christ of Latter-day Saints in Peru refers to the Church of Jesus Christ of Latter-day Saints (LDS Church) and its members in Peru. The first small branch was established in 1956. Since then, the LDS Church in Peru has grown to more than 600,000 members in 780 congregations. Peru ranks as having the 2nd most members of the LDS Church in South America, behind Brazil, and the 5th worldwide. In addition, It has the third most LDS Church members per capita in South America, behind Chile and Uruguay.

History
The first official branch of the LDS Church in Peru was organized in July 1956.

Three native Peruvian elders were assassinated by militant groups in the early 1990s: Manuel Antonio Hidalgo and Christian Andreani Ugarte, who were killed in August 1990, and Oscar Zapata, who was killed in March 1991. Nonetheless, unlike Pentecostals and Adventists, who played critical roles in Peruvian politics of the day, the LDS church remained relatively disengaged with the war.

At the end of 1993, one study found that there were around 234,000 LDS adherents in Peru. This same study also found that, in Peru, there were only about 4,500 adherents per stake, the lowest density out of all of the Latin American countries studied (for comparison, the highest was Colombia, which was found to have 7,500 adherents per stake). This study also found that some 44% of stakes were found within the Lima metropolitan area and 73% were found more broadly across only the coastal areas.

Missions

Temples

See also

Religion in Peru

References

External links
 LDS Newsroom - Peru
 The Church of Jesus Christ of Latter-day Saints (Peru) - official site
 ComeUntoChrist.org Latter-day Saints visitor site